Palace (lit. Jade Palace Lock Heart) is a 2011 Chinese television series produced by Yu Zheng; starring Yang Mi, Feng Shaofeng, Mickey He and Tong Liya. The series was directed by Lee Wai-chu and starred cast members from mainland China, Taiwan and Hong Kong. The series was first broadcast on Hunan TV in China from 31 January to 21 February 2011. It is later followed by Palace 2 (Chinese: 宮鎖珠帘) (2012), Palace 3: The Lost Daughter (Chinese: 宫锁连城), and the film The Palace (2013 film).

The series was extremely popular during its run and led to widespread fame for its cast.

Synopsis
Luo Qingchuan (Yang Mi) is a modern day actress. One day she decided to try a romantic role which she has never done before so she scouted around and found a director who intended to direct and produce a romance drama set in the Qing Dynasty, during the reign of Emperor YongZheng.

The rest of the drama is focused on her character becoming embroiled in the princes' struggle for the throne and is torn between her love for Yin Si (Feng Shaofeng), the eighth prince, and Yin Zhen (Mickey He), the fourth prince and future Emperor Yongzheng. She is also betrayed by her friend Tong Suyan (Tong Liya). Caught in the crossfire of political intrigue, her wit and compassion serves her well in her bid to stay alive.

Cast

Main 
 Yang Mi as Luo Qingchuan 
 Feng Shaofeng as Yinsi, the 8th prince
 Mickey He as Yinzhen, the 4th prince
 Tong Liya as Tong Suyan

Supporting

The Imperial Men
 Kent Tong as the Kangxi Emperor
 Zong Fengyan as Yinreng, the crown prince 
 Ma Wenlong as Yintang, the 9th prince 
 Liu Bin as Yin'e, the 10th prince
 Tian Zhenwei as Yinxiang, the 13th prince
 Mao Zijun as Yinti, the 14th prince

The Imperial Women 
 Leanne Liu as Consort De
 Sonija Kwok as Concubine Xi  
 Maggie Shiu as Consort Liang / Empress Hešeri 
 Amber Xu as Jinzhi
 Vicki He as Xueru, the Crown princess 
 Zhang Tong as Princess Bingyue

People of the Palace
 Shen Baoping as Longkodo
 Wilson Guo as Xiao Shunzi  
 Lu Jiarong as Fei Cui 
 Ye Simiao as Jin Momo 
 Liu Jiayuan as Xin Lian 
 Lu Yi as Ying Shuang
 Yuan Shanshan as Ru Bing

Others
 Xi Xue as Princess Ningxiang 
 He Xianda as Songgotu
 Wang Xianghong as Gu Xiaochun (later Nian Gengyao)
 Li Qindong as Nian Gengyao

Present day 
 Yan Yikuan as Lin Feifan 
 Liu Fang as Qingchuan's mother 
 Zhu Yaying as Lin Feifan's mother

Historical inaccuracies
One historical inaccuracy is that although this is a historical drama, the protagonist Luo Qingchuan was shown wearing yellow even when she was not a member of the imperial household. It is a very serious inaccuracy because in Imperial China, such a disregard could have someone put to death by the Emperor for not respecting this custom.

Soundtrack

Awards

See also
 Scarlet Heart

References

External links
  Palace on Sina.com

2011 Chinese television series debuts
2011 Chinese television series endings
Alternate history television series
Fiction about body swapping
Television series set in the Qing dynasty
Chinese romance television series
Chinese historical television series
Chinese time travel television series
Mandarin-language television shows
Television shows written by Yu Zheng
Hunan Television dramas
Television series by H&R Century Pictures
Television series by Huanyu Film